AMRL may refer to:

 Armored Medical Research Laboratory, U.S. Army
 AASHTO Materials Reference Laboratory, part of the American Association of State Highway and Transportation Officials
 Aeronautical & Maritime Research Laboratory, part of the Australian Defence Science and Technology Group